Noun River may refer to:

Noun River (Cameroon)
Noun River (Morocco)